Pat or Patrick Flanagan may refer to:

 Pat Flanagan (English footballer) (born 1891), English footballer
 Pat Flanagan (Gaelic footballer), Gaelic football manager and former player
 Pat Flanagan (sportscaster) (1893–1963), American baseball announcer
 Patrick Flanagan (born 1944), inventor of the Neurophone
 Patrick Flanagan (tug of war), American tug of war athlete